The following is a timeline of the history of the city of Moscow, Russia.

Prior to 16th century

 1147 – Yuri Dolgoruki had a meeting with Sviatoslav Olgovich in a place called Moscow. First mentioning about Moscow in manuscript.
 1237 - The 'grad of Moscow' destroyed by the Mongols.
 1272 – Daniil Aleksandrovich becomes Grand Prince of Moscow.
 1283 – Grand Duchy of Moscow territory established.
 1300 - The Kremlin, or fort, was enclosed by a strong wall of earth and timber.
 1303 – Yuriy Danilovich becomes Grand Prince of Moscow.
 1325 – Seat of "metropolitan of Central Russia" relocated to Moscow.
 1327 – Uspensky Church consecrated.
 1328 – Ivan I becomes Grand Prince of Moscow.
 1333 – St. Michael cathedral built.
 1339 - The 'grad of Moscow' rebuilt in oak.
 1341 – Simeon Ivanovich Gordyi becomes Grand Prince of Moscow.
 1353 – Ivan II becomes Grand Prince of Moscow.
 1358 – Chudov Monastery founded.
 1362 – Dmitry Donskoy becomes Grand Prince of Moscow.
 1367 – Moscow Kremlin (citadel) founded.
 1369 – Moscow besieged.
 1382 – Siege of Moscow (1382).
 1386 - Nativity Convent (Rozhdestvensky convent) founded.
 1389
 Vasily I becomes Grand Prince of Moscow.
 Ascension Convent founded in the Kremlin (approximate date).
 1397
 Sretensky Monastery founded.
 Blagovyeshchensk Cathedral built.
 1425 – Vasily II becomes Grand Prince of Moscow.
 1462 – Ivan III becomes Grand Prince of Moscow.
 1479 – Dormition Cathedral built in the Kremlin.
 1491 – Spasskaya Gate built.
 1492 - Palace of Facets (Granovitaya Palata) - state banqueting hall.
 1495 – "Dungeons built under the Kremlin's Trinity Tower."

16th–17th centuries
 1502 – 14 April: Coronation of Ivan III as Grand Prince of Moscow.
 1505 – Vasili III becomes Grand Prince of Moscow.
 1508 – Cathedral of the Archangel and Ivan the Great Bell Tower built.
 1520 - Moscow said to contain "45,000 houses and 100,000 inhabitants".
 1524/5 - Novodevichy Convent constructed.
 1533 – Ivan the Terrible becomes Grand Prince of Moscow.
 1547
 City becomes capital of the grand duchy of Russia.
 Fire.
 1555 – Muscovy Trading Company of England active.
 1560 – Saint Basil's Cathedral built.
 1564 – Ivan Fyodorov (printer) active; Moscow Print Yard established.
 1571 – City taken by Tartar forces from Crimea.
 1576 - Paper mill established.
 1591 – Donskoy Monastery founded.
 1593 – Bely Gorod wall built.
 1598 - Time of Troubles (ended 1613).
 1600 – Zaikonospassky monastery founded.
 1601 – Famine.
 1611 – City taken by forces of Sigismund III of Poland.
 1612 – Moscow Uprising of 1612.
 1636 – Kazan Cathedral consecrated.
 1652
 Nativity Church at Putinki built.
 German Quarter developed near city.
 1656 – Church of the Twelve Apostles dedicated in the Kremlin.
 1661 – Saviour Cathedral built.
 1662 – Copper Riot.
 1672 – Chorina Comedy Theatre is founded. 
 1682 – Moscow Uprising of 1682.
 1687 – Greek Latin School established.
 1689 - Moscow Theological Academy Library established.
 1692 – Vysokopetrovsky Monastery katholikon (church) built.
 1698 – Streltsy Uprising.

18th century
 1701 – Sukharev Tower built.
 1702 – Public theatre active.
 1703 
 Vedomosti newspaper begins publication.
 Peter the Great "encounters opposition" in Moscow which compels him to leave.
 1708 – Moscow Governorate established.
 1712 – Russian capital relocated from Moscow to Saint Petersburg.
 1721 – Moscow Synodal Choir founded.
 1728 - Russian capital moved back to Moscow under influence of the Supreme Privy Council.
 1732 - Russian capital relocated back to Saint Petersburg.
 1735 – Tsar Bell cast.
 1739 – Fire.
 1742 – Rampart built.
 1748 – Fire.
 1750 - Population: (approx) 150,000.
 1752 – Fire.
 1755 – Imperial University founded.
 1764 – Foundling Hospital built.
 1764 – Moscow Orphanage founded. 
 1765 – Novodevichii Institute founded. 
 1765 – Maiden Field Theatre founded. 
 1766 – Russian Theatre founded.
 1769 – Znamensky Theatre founded.
 1771
 Chudov Monastery re-built.
 Plague.
 September: Plague Riot.
 Vvedenskoye Cemetery in use (approximate date).
 1772 – Commercial School founded.
 1773 - Catherine Palace reconstruction begins.
 1775 – Platon Levshin becomes Metropolitan of Moscow.
 1777 – Preobrazhenskoye Cemetery inaugurated near city.
 1780 - Petrovsky Palace founded.
 1782 – Police Board established.
 1786 – Pashkov House built.
 1787 – Senate House built.
 1790 – Peterburskoye Schosse road paved.
 1792 – Tverskaya Square laid out.

19th century
 1805 - Moscow Society of Naturalists founded.
 1806 – Maly Theatre founded.
 1809 – Shchepkin Theatre School established.
 1812
 French invasion.
 September: Fire of Moscow (1812).
 Population: 250,000 
 1816 – Kremlin rebuilt.
 1817 – Excise office built.
 1821 – Philaret Drozdov becomes Metropolitan of Moscow.
 1823 – Alexander Garden laid out.
 1825 – Bolshoi Theatre opens.
 1830 - Moscow Craft School established.
 1849 – Grand Kremlin Palace built.
 1851
 Moscow – Saint Petersburg Railway begins operating.
 Saint Petersburg railway station and Kremlin Armoury building constructed.
 1856
 The Russian Messenger (literary magazine) begins publication.
 Tretyakov Gallery initiated.
 1861
 Petushki-Moscow railway built.
 Public museum established.
 1862
 Nizhny Novgorod-Moscow railway built.
 Rumiantsev Library established.
 Moscow Yaroslavsky railway station built.
 1864 – Kazansky railway station opens.
 1865
 Golitzyn museum established.
 Industrial exhibit held.
 Tolstoy's War and Peace begins publication in The Russian Messenger.
 1866 – Moscow Conservatory and Merchant Bank founded.
 1867 - Einem brothers chocolate factory founded.
 1868 – Borodinsky Bridge built.
 1870 – Belorussky railway station opens.
 1871
 Trade Bank founded.
 Population: 611,970.
 1872
 State Historical Museum founded.
 Moscow University for Women founded.
 1877 – Premiere of Tchaikovsky's Swan Lake ballet.
 1878 – Sokolniki Park established.
 1880 – Pushkin statue installed in Strastnaya Square.
 1882 - Population: 753,469.
 1883
 Cathedral of Christ the Saviour consecrated.
 Redesign of coat of arms of Moscow adopted.
 1885 – Private Opera established.
 1887 – Morozovtsi Orekhovo-Zuevo Moskva (football club) formed.
 1891 – May: French exhibit opens.
 1892 – City Hall built.
 1893 – Bazaar built in Kitay-Gorod.
 1894 – Moscow Hermitage Garden opens.
 1896
 26 May: Coronation of Nicholas II.
 30 May: Khodynka Tragedy.
 December: Student demonstration.
 Museum of History of Moscow founded.
 Kursky railway station built.
 1897
 Russian Electrical Theatre (cinema) opens.
 Population: 988,610.
 1898
 Moscow Art Theatre founded.
 All-Russia Insurance Company building constructed.
 Novodevichy Cemetery inaugurated.
 1899
 6 April: First electric Moscow tram begins operating.
 7 November: Premiere of Chekhov's Uncle Vanya.
 Moscow City Chess Championship active.
 "Student agitation" begins.
 1900
 Paveletsky railway station built.
 Population: 1,023,817.

20th century

1900s–1940s
 1901 – Rizhsky railway station built.
 1902 – Savyolovsky railway station built.
 1903
 Zimin Opera founded.
 Hotel National in business.
 1904
 29 June: 1904 Moscow tornado.
 Yaroslavsky railway station rebuilt.
 1905 – Moscow Uprising of 1905.
 1907
 Moscow Little Ring Railway begins operating.
 Hotel Metropol built.
 Population: 1,359,254.
 1908 – Moscow Public University established.
 1912
 Durov Animal Theater founded.
 Museum of Fine Arts opens.
 Borodinsky Bridge rebuilt.
 1913
 Spaso House (residence) built.
 Population: 1,817,100.
 1914 – Shchukin Theatre Institute founded.
 1916 - Automobile Moscow Society factory established.
 1917 – 25 October-2 November: Moscow Bolshevik Uprising.
 1918
 March: City becomes capital of the Russian Soviet Federative Socialist Republic.
 July: Left SR uprising.
 Moscow Soviet of People's Deputies established.
 Kiyevsky railway station built.
 Izvestia newspaper in publication.
 1919
 March: Founding Congress of the Comintern held.
 Moscow State Jewish Theater established.
 1920 - Treaty of Moscow (1920)
 1921
 Moscow Children's Theatre opens.
 Moscow Institute of Oriental Studies established.
 1921 - Treaty of Moscow (1921)
 1922 – Moscow Sport Circle (football club) formed.
 1923 – Moscow Municipal Council of Professional Unions theatre founded.
 1924
 Lenin Mausoleum established.
 All-Union Radio begins broadcasting.
 1925
 Lenin Library active.
 Yermolova Theatre founded.
 1928 – Rusakov Workers' Club and Zuev Workers' Club buildings constructed.
 1929
 Moscow Oblast and Moscow Circus School established.
 Kauchuk Factory Club built.
 1930 – Moscow State Institute for History and Archives and Moscow Institute of Steel and Alloys established.
 1934 – Museum of Architecture founded.
 1935
 15 May:  Moscow Metro begins operating.
 Hotel Moskva in business.
 1936
 Moscow Trials begin in the House of the Unions.
 2 May: Premiere of Prokofiev's Peter and the Wolf.
 1937
 Smolensky Metro Bridge built.
 Volga-Moscow canal opens.
 1938 – Gorbunov Palace of Culture (concert hall), Bolshoy Kamenny Bridge, and Bolshoy Ustinsky Bridge built.
 1939 – Population: 4,137,018.
 1941 – October: Battle of Moscow begins.
 1942 – January: Battle of Moscow ends.
 1943 - Laboratory No. 2 of the USSR Academy of Sciences established.
 1945 – 24 June: Moscow Victory Parade of 1945.
 1948 – Museum of Lenin's funeral train founded.

1950s–1990s
 1953 - 5 March: Joseph Stalin dies.
 1954 – Hotel Leningradskaya built.
 1957
 Moscow Central Clinical Hospital opened.
 City hosts Ice hockey world championship
 City hosts 6th World Festival of Youth and Students.
 1959
 Moscow International Film Festival officially starts with its debut edition.
 Population: 5,032,000.
 24 July: Nixon-Khrushchev Kitchen Debate occurs at the American National Exhibition.
 1960 
 Peoples' Friendship University founded.
 Moscow Ring Road is the new city border. Tushino, Babushkin, Perovo, Kuntsevo, Lyublino became parts of Moscow.
 1961
 Rossiya Cinema built.
 October: American Committee for Non-Violent Action peace walkers arrive in Moscow.
 1962
  established.
 Moscow Domodedovo Airport opens.
 1963 - Nuclear Test Ban Treaty signed in Moscow.
 1964 – Taganka Theatre founded.
 1965 - Population: 6,366,000.
 1966 – Gorizont Cinema opens.
 1968 – 25 August: 1968 Red Square demonstration.
 1970 – Population: 6,941,961.
 1971 – Great Moscow State Circus auditorium opens.
 1979
 Spartak Tennis Club built.
 Moscow Virtuosi orchestra formed.
 1980 – 1980 Summer Olympics held.
 1981 – Moscow International Peace Marathon begins.
 1982 – Satyricon Theatre opens its doors.
 1985 - Population: 8,642,000.
 1988 – Moscow People's Front organized.
 1989
 August: Moscow Music Peace Festival.
 Population: 8,967,332.
 1990
 Gavriil Kharitonovich Popov becomes mayor.
 Moscow Federation of Trade Unions and Sobinbank founded.
 Kremlin Cup tennis tournament begins.
 1991
 August: 1991 Soviet coup d'état attempt.
 Moscow Chamber of Commerce and Russian State University for the Humanities established.
 Prix Benois de la Danse (ballet contest) begins.
 1992
 Moscow Interbank Currency Exchange and Russian Institute of Strategic Studies established.
 Yury Luzhkov becomes mayor.
 Moscow Times English-language newspaper begins publication.
 Figure Skating Federation of Russia headquartered in city.
 1993
 Moscow designated capital of the Russian Federation per Constitution.
 TV-6 begins broadcasting.
 Moscow City Duma and American Center in Moscow founded.
 Kazan Cathedral reconstructed.
 1995
 Arch Moscow exhibit begins.
 Hungry Duck bar in business.
 Monument erected in Victory Park.
 1996 – 11 November: Kotlyakovskoya Cemetery bombing.
 1997
 Memorial Mosque built on Poklonnaya Hill.
 Moscow Marathon Luzhniki begins.
 1999 – September: Apartment bombing.
 2000 - City becomes part of the Central Federal District.

21st century

 2002 – 23–26 October: Moscow theater hostage crisis.
 2003
 Moscow International Performing Arts Centre opens.
 9 December: 2003 Red Square bombing.
 Federation Tower construction begins.
 2004
 Moscow Monorail begins operating.
 Grand Prix of Moscow cycling race begins.
 February 2004 Moscow Metro bombing.
 August 2004 Moscow Metro bombing.
 2005
 Moscow Biennale of Contemporary Art begins.
 2 July: Live 8 concert, Moscow held in Red Square.
 2006
 21 August: 2006 Moscow market bombing.
 Protest against ban of Moscow Pride.
 IgroMir (gaming exhibit) begins.
 Triumph Palace erected in the Sokol neighborhood.
 2007
 Museum of Soviet Arcade Machines established.
 Naberezhnaya Tower built.
 2009
 City of Capitals built.
 Eurovision Song Contest held.
 Kirill becomes Patriarch of Moscow and all Russia.
 2010
 29 March: 2010 Moscow Metro bombings.
 Vladimir Resin becomes mayor, succeeded by Sergey Sobyanin.
 2011
 24 January: Domodedovo International Airport bombing.
 Moscow Exchange established.
 2012 – March: Arrest of Pussy Riot (musical group) performers.
 2013
 8 September: Moscow mayoral election, 2013.
 2014 - Peace Procession against war in Ukraine 
 Population: 11,794,282.
 2015
 27 February: Politician Nemtsov assassinated.
 Gulag museum opens.
2016 - 10 September: Moscow Central Ring of the Little Ring of the Moscow Railway begins operating.
 2018
 5 May - Cossack consplayers attacking to people, mainly to scholars.
FIFA World Cup 2018 in Russia. Luzhniki and Spartak stadiums host matches.
 2020
 August- Destroying of the Moscow trolley system.

See also

 History of Moscow
 List of heads of Moscow
 List of Metropolitans and Patriarchs of Moscow
 
 Timelines of other cities in the Central Federal District of Russia: Smolensk, Voronezh

References

This article incorporates information from the Russian Wikipedia.

Bibliography

Published in 16th–18th centuries
  (First published in 1589)

Published in 19th century

Published in 20th century

Published in 21st century

External links

 Europeana. Items related to Moscow, various dates.
 Digital Public Library of America. Items related to Moscow, various dates

Moscow-related lists
Moscow
Years in Russia
moscow
Moscow